Churachandpur District (Meitei pronunciation: /tʃʊraːˌtʃaːnɗpʊr/), is one of the 16 districts in the southwestern corner of the Indian state of Manipur that covers an area of . It is named after the Meitei King Churachand Singh, the Maharaja of Manipur Kingdom. Churachandpur district which was previously known as Manipur South District came into existence in the year 1969 along with the district reorganization of Manipur.

Demographics
As of the 2011 Census of India, Churachandpur district had a population of 271,274, roughly equal to that of Barbados. This gives it a ranking of 575th in India (out of a total of 640 districts). Its population growth rate over the decade 2001–2011 was 19.03%. Churachandpur has a sex ratio of 969 females for every 1000 males, and a literacy rate of 84.29%.

Census towns 
There are three census towns in Churachandpur District:
 Rengkai (Most populated town in the district)
 Zenhang Lamka
 Hill town

Villages 
 

Ngaloi

Educational facilities

Colleges 
 Churachandpur Medical College
 Churachandpur Government College

Private Colleges 
Rayburn College
Evangelical College of Theology, Rengkai
Trinity College of Seminar, Sielmat
Sielmat Bible College, Sielmat
Grace Bible College , New Lamka

Government High School 
Rengkai Government Higher Secondary School

Private Universities 
Sangai International University , Rengkai Road

Health 
District Hospital Churachandpur is located within Churachandpur town. Initially it was a dispensary with few staffs and in the year 1968 it became a 50 bedded Civil Hospital which was inaugurated by Shri Baleswar Prasad, Chief Commissioner of Manipur on 8/6/1968. The hospital was extended with another 50 bedded new building inaugurated on 17 May 1985 by the Medical Minister Shri T. Phungzathang Tonsing and became a 100 bedded one. The present Building OPD block was inaugurated on 31/05/2002 and O.T wing on 23/12/2013 and lastly the Trauma Centre on 19/07/2014 by the Hon’ble Chief Minister in presence of Health Minister and Industries Minister. The Government of Manipur approved upgrading the hospital to 200 bedded ward and start the process of making it a Hill Medical College under the leadership of Hon’ble Medical Minister.

Economy
In 2006 the Ministry of Panchayati Raj named Churachandpur one of the country's most impoverished districts (out of a total of 640). It is one of the three districts in Manipur currently receiving funds from the Backward Regions Grant Fund (BRGF).

Climate
The location is north of Tropic of Cancer in northern hemisphere, it has summer season in March, April and May with warm, hot and sunny weather. Rainy season starts April and last till October. The winter season is cool and dry.

Transportation

Airport 
Nearest airport from Churachandpur is Imphal Airport at Imphal which is about 60 Km.

Media 
The major private television channels/cables are Angels Vision Digital Cable, Hornbill Cable Network, TC Network and Tullou TV.

Government, Politics and Administration 
Administration is carried out by the Deputy Commissioners or District Magistrates with support of the District level officer and Block Development officers. The district collector office is located at Tuibong/Tuibuang Town.

The administrative setup of Churachandpur District.

 Sub Divisions & Blocks
 Autonomous District Councils
 Towns
 Police Stations
 Assembly Constituencies

Autonomous district council 
At the district level there is the Churachandpur Autonomous District Council created by "The Manipur (Hill Areas) District Council Act, 1971,” passed by Parliament. The Autonomous District Council is to administer areas which have been given autonomy within the states under Manipur (Hill Areas) District Councils Act, 1971. In accordance with this Act Autonomous (Hill) District Council is empowered to maintain and manage of property: movable and immovable, and institutions under their jurisdiction. Churachandpur Autonomous District Council has 24 constituencies.

Notes

References

Other sources

 The history and land-holding behind Manipur South District with Special Reference to the Haokip Reserved Land- 1907, T.S Letkhosei Haokip (Manipur University).
 Chinkhopau (1995) Churachandpur District, Churachandpur: Published by Author.
 District Statistical Handbook – Churachandpur: District Statistical Officer.
 Gangte, Thangzam (undated) Churachandpur Chanchin (An Account of Churachandpur)
 Ginsum, H (undated) Lamka Vangkhua (Lamka Town).
 Kamkhenthang, Dr. H (1995) "Lamka Town vis-a-vis Churachandpur", Shan (daily), 21 December.
 Kamkhenthang (1998) "Lamka (Churachandpur)" in B.D. Ray, A.K. Neog & H.K. Mazhari (eds.) Urban Development in North-East India : Potentiality and Problems, New Delhi: Vedams Books.
 Manipur State Archives, Imphal: Manipur State Durbar 1907–1947 – Papers related to the Court of the President of Manipur State Durbar, Hill Misc. Case No. 28 of 1945–46, Phungkhothang Chief of Hiangtam Lamka; also Misc Case No. 504 of 1934 Phungkhothang Chief of Hiangtam Lamka.

External links
 Churachandpur District Administration
 Churachandpur Autonomous District Council

 
Districts of Manipur
Minority Concentrated Districts in India